Ugoy-ugoy, also spelled ogoy-ogoy, are Filipino layered biscuits. They are typically rectangular or ribbon-like in shape and are topped with granulated sugar. It is particularly associated with the city of Iloilo.

See also
Paborita
Galletas de patatas

References 

Philippine pastries
Biscuits